Grevillea wittweri is a shrub of the genus Grevillea native to an area in the southern Wheatbelt region of Western Australia.<ref name=FB>{{FloraBase|name=Grevillea wittweri|id=2123}}</ref> It was listed as a vulnerable species in 2018 by the  International Union for Conservation of Nature.

Description
It blooms between September and April and produces a terminal raceme irregular inflorescence with green, pink or brown flowers with red or purple styles. It regenerates from seed and has a generation length of about 25 years.

Taxonomy
The species was first formally described by the botanist Donald McGillivray in 1986 as a part of the work New Names in Grevillea (Proteaceae). The name is commonly misapplied to Grevillea armigera''.

Distribution
It has a scattered distribution throughout the Wheatbelt from between the Shire of Kent, Shire of Kondinin, Shire of Ravensthorpe, Shire of Kulin and Shire of Lake Grace. It is commonly found growing on sandplains in sandy soils often around salt lakes as a part of shrubland and mallee shrubland communities.

See also
 List of Grevillea species

References

wittweri
Proteales of Australia
Eudicots of Western Australia
Taxa named by Donald McGillivray
Plants described in 1986